Pachycheles is a genus of porcelain crabs in the family Porcellanidae. There are more than 40 described species in Pachycheles.

Species
These 47 species belong to the genus Pachycheles:

 Pachycheles ackieianus A.Milne Edwards
 Pachycheles ackleianus A. Milne-Edwards, 1880
 Pachycheles attaragos Harvey & de Santo, 1997
 Pachycheles barbatus A.Milne-Edwards, 1878
 Pachycheles bellus (Osorio, 1887)
 Pachycheles biocellatus (Lockington, 1878)
 Pachycheles calculosus Haig, 1960
 Pachycheles chacei Haig, 1956
 Pachycheles chubutensis Boschi, 1963
 Pachycheles crassus (A.Milne-Edwards, 1869)
 Pachycheles crinimanus Haig, 1960
 Pachycheles cristobalensis Gore, 1970
 Pachycheles dorsosulcatus Beschin & al., 2007
 Pachycheles granti Haig, 1965
 Pachycheles greeleyi (Rathbun, 1900)
 Pachycheles grossimanus (Guérin, 1835)
 Pachycheles hertwigi Balss, 1913
 Pachycheles holosericus Schmitt, 1921
 Pachycheles johnsoni Haig, 1965
 Pachycheles laevidactylus Ortmann, 1892
 Pachycheles latus Rathbun, 1918
 Pachycheles marcortezensis Glassell, 1936
 Pachycheles meloi Ferreira & Tavares, 2017
 Pachycheles monilifer (Dana, 1852)
 Pachycheles natalensis (Krauss, 1843)
 Pachycheles palpebrosus Glassell
 Pachycheles panamensis Faxon, 1893
 Pachycheles pectinicarpus Stimpson, 1858
 Pachycheles pilosus (H. Milne Edwards, 1837)
 Pachycheles pisoides (C. Heller, 1865)
 Pachycheles pubescens Holmes, 1900
 Pachycheles riisei (Stimpson, 1858)
 Pachycheles rudis Stimpson, 1859 (thickclaw porcelain crab)
 Pachycheles rugimanus A. Milne-Edwards, 1880
 Pachycheles sahariensis Monod, 1933
 Pachycheles serratus (Benedict, 1901)
 Pachycheles setiferous Yang, 1996
 Pachycheles setimanus (Lockington, 1878)
 Pachycheles spinidactylus Haig, 1957
 Pachycheles stevensii Stimpson, 1858
 Pachycheles subsetosus Haig, 1960
 Pachycheles susanae Gore & Abele, 1974
 Pachycheles tomentosus Henderson, 1893
 Pachycheles trichotus Haig, 1960
 Pachycheles tuerkayi Werding & Hiller, 2017
 Pachycheles velerae Haig, 1960
 Pachycheles vicarius Nobili, 1901

References

Further reading

 

Anomura
Decapod genera
Taxa named by William Stimpson
Articles created by Qbugbot